Diane Ladd is an American actress. She has appeared in over 120 film and television roles. For the 1974 film Alice Doesn't Live Here Anymore, she won the BAFTA Award for Best Actress in a Supporting Role and was nominated for the Academy Award for Best Supporting Actress. She went on to win the Golden Globe Award for Best Supporting Actress on Television for Alice (1980–81), and to receive Academy Award nominations for Wild at Heart (1990) and Rambling Rose (1991). Her other film appearances include Chinatown (1974), National Lampoon's Christmas Vacation (1989), Ghosts of Mississippi (1996), Primary Colors (1998), 28 Days (2000), American Cowslip (2008) and Joy (2015). Ladd is the mother of actress Laura Dern, with her ex-husband, actor Bruce Dern.

Personal life
Ladd was born Rose Diane Ladner, the only child of Mary Bernadette Ladner (née Anderson), a housewife and actress, and Preston Paul Ladner, a veterinarian who sold products for poultry and livestock. She was born in Laurel, Mississippi, while the family were visiting relatives for Thanksgiving, though they lived in Meridian, Mississippi. Ladd is related to playwright Tennessee Williams and poet Sidney Lanier. Ladd was raised in her mother's Catholic faith.

Ladd was married to actor and one-time co-star Bruce Dern from 1960 to 1969, and had two daughters; Diane Elizabeth Dern, who died at 18 months, and Laura Dern, who became an actress. Ladd and Laura Dern co-starred in the films Wild at Heart, Rambling Rose, Citizen Ruth, and Inland Empire and in the HBO series Enlightened. The two also appeared together in White Lightning and Alice Doesn't Live Here Anymore, although the very young Laura Dern was uncredited in both.

, Ladd is married to Robert Charles Hunter. 

In 2018, Ladd was misdiagnosed with pneumonia and given 6 months to a year to live after she inhaled “poison spray” from the farms neighbouring her home, constricting her esophagus. Her daughter, Laura, transferred her to another hospital where she made a full recovery.

Career
In 1971, Ladd joined the cast of the CBS soap opera The Secret Storm. She was the second actress to play the role of Kitty Styles on the long-running daytime serial. She later had a supporting role in Roman Polanski's 1974 film Chinatown, and was nominated for an Academy Award for Best Actress in a Supporting Role for her role as Flo in the film Alice Doesn't Live Here Anymore. That film inspired the television series Alice, in which Flo was portrayed by Polly Holliday. When Holliday left the TV series, Ladd succeeded her as waitress Isabelle "Belle" Dupree.

She appeared in the independent screwball comedy Hold Me, Thrill Me, Kiss Me in 1992, where she played a flirty, aging Southern belle alongside her real mother, actress Mary Lanier.

In 1993, Ladd appeared in the episode "Guess Who's Coming to Chow?" of the CBS comedy/western series Harts of the West in the role of the mother of co-star Harley Jane Kozak. The 15-episode program, set on a dude ranch in Nevada, starred Beau Bridges and Lloyd Bridges.

In 2004, Ladd played psychic Mrs. Druse in the television miniseries of Stephen King's Kingdom Hospital. In April 2006, Ladd released her first book, Spiraling Through The School of Life: A Mental, Physical, and Spiritual Discovery. In 2007, she co-starred in the Lifetime Television film Montana Sky.

In addition to her Academy Award nomination for Alice Doesn't Live Here Anymore, she was also nominated (again in the Best Actress in a Supporting Role category) for both Wild at Heart and Rambling Rose, both of which she starred alongside her daughter Laura Dern. Dern received a nomination for Best Actress for Rambling Rose. The dual mother and daughter nominations for Ladd and Dern in Rambling Rose marked the first time in Academy Awards history that such an event had occurred. They were also nominated for dual Golden Globe Awards in the same year.

Ladd has also worked in theatre. She made her Broadway debut in Carry Me Back to Morningside Heights in 1968. In 1976, she starred in A Texas Trilogy: Lu Ann Hampton Laverty Oberlander, for which she received a Drama Desk Award nomination.

On November 1, 2010, Ladd, Laura Dern, and Bruce Dern received adjoining stars on the Hollywood Walk of Fame; this is the first time family members have been given such consideration on the Walk. Ladd's star is the 2,421st.

She starred in the Hallmark Channel series Chesapeake Shores.

Filmography

Film

Television

Awards and nominations

References

External links

 
 
 
 
 
 
 
 Diane Ladd biodata (with wrong year of birth), alicehyatt.com; accessed May 9, 2014.

20th-century American actresses
21st-century American actresses
Living people
Actresses from Mississippi
American film actresses
American memoirists
American people of German descent
American stage actresses
American television actresses
American women film directors
American women memoirists
Best Supporting Actress BAFTA Award winners
Best Supporting Actress Golden Globe (television) winners
Catholics from Mississippi
Dern family
Film directors from Mississippi
Independent Spirit Award for Best Supporting Female winners
People from Laurel, Mississippi
People from Meridian, Mississippi
Writers from Mississippi
Year of birth missing (living people)